Alexandru (Sándor) Tyroler  (19 October 1891, in Garamszentkereszt, now Žiar nad Hronom, Slovakia – 3 February 1973, in Budapest, Hungary) was a Hungarian-Romanian chess master.

Sándor Tyroler was born in Garamszentkereszt in Hungary (now Slovakia) into a Hungarian Jewish family. After World War I, following the Treaty of Trianon (1920), he became a citizen of Romania.  
 
In 1912, he took 5th in Temesvár (Austria-Hungary), now Timișoara, Romania. In 1925, he won in Bucharest. In 1926, he won the first Romanian Chess Championship in Sibiu. In 1927, he won in Bucharest (ROM-ch). In 1928, he took 15th in The Hague (Amateur World Championship, Max Euwe won). In 1929, he won in Iaşi (ROM-ch). In 1929, he took 6th in Bucharest. In 1930, he took 3rd in Cernăuţi (ROM-ch).

Alexandru Tyroler represented Romania in the 2nd unofficial Chess Olympiad at Budapest 1926, where he won team bronze medal. He also played at 3rd board (+4 –7 =4) in the 3rd Chess Olympiad at Hamburg 1930.

References

External links
Alexandru Tyroler at 365Chess.com

1891 births
1973 deaths
Sportspeople from Žiar nad Hronom
Slovak Jews
20th-century Hungarian people
Hungarian chess players
Romanian chess players
Slovak chess players
Jewish chess players
Chess Olympiad competitors
Romanian people of Hungarian-Jewish descent
Austro-Hungarian emigrants to Romania
20th-century chess players